Argyle Street is a four-lane dual-way thoroughfare in Kowloon, Hong Kong, connecting the districts of Mong Kok, Ho Man Tin, Ma Tau Wai and Kowloon City. It runs on an east-west alignment starting at its intersection with Cherry Street, Ferry Street and Tong Mi Road in the west, and ending near the former Kai Tak Airport in the east. Due to the street's proximity with the latter, a variety of aircraft could be seen from this street and thus photographers (and movie makers) seized the opportunity to capture landing aircraft.

The street was named after a British merchant ship called Argyle, which sailed between India and southern China in the early 19th Century.

Features
Amenities and buildings along the street include the Kowloon City Law Courts, the Kowloon Hospital, the Hong Kong Eye Hospital, the headquarters of the Hospital Authority, and the Kowloon West Police Headquarters.

Langham Place opened in 2005 is situated near the west end of the street.

Landmarks
 Langham Place
 Sincere Podium
 Argyle Street Waterworks Depot (demolished in 2019)
 Mong Kok East station
 Diocesan Boys' School
 CLP Group Headquarters
 Kowloon Hospital
 Hong Kong Eye Hospital
 Kowloon City Magistrates' Courts
 Olympic Garden

Transportation

Mong Kok traffic control in the 1970s
As the MTR was built in the 1970s, and some exits of the Mong Kok Station had occupied the right lanes of Argyle Street from Sai Yeung Choi Street to Portland Street, thus the government at the time had made the control in effect: vehicles can only travel westbound in uni-direction between the streets mentioned above. As a result, vehicles from Tai Kok Tsui via Argyle Street, eastbound towards Kowloon City, shall make a left turn to Reclamation Street, then turn right into Mong Kok Road. After crossing the junction between Mong Kok Road and Nathan Road, one shall turn right to either Sai Yeung Choi Street or Sai Yee Street in order to lead back to Argyle Street. For the same reason, vehicles are not allowed to make a right turn directly from Nathan Road to Argyle Street, and must follow the route described above.

MTR
The MTR's Mong Kok station is located at the intersection of Argyle Street and Nathan Road, and the East Rail line's Mong Kok East station is located several blocks to the east, near the street's intersection with Luen Wan Street (聯運街) .

Airport

The old Kai Tak airport was near here.

See also
Argyle Street Camp
List of streets and roads in Hong Kong

References
 Hong Kong Place: Hong Kong street names with British origins (in Traditional Chinese)

External links

Google Maps of Argyle Street

Kowloon City
Ma Tau Wai
Mong Kok
Roads in Kowloon